The following is a list of Colorado State Rams men's basketball head coaches. There have been 20 head coaches of the Rams in their 120-season history.

Colorado State's current head coach is Niko Medved. He was hired as the Rams' head coach in March 2018, replacing Jase Herl, who was not retained after his stint as interim head coach.

References

Colorado State

Colorado State Rams men's basketball coaches